Michael Ferguson may refer to:
Michael Ferguson (Irish politician) (1953–2006), Irish Sinn Féin politician who represented Belfast West
Michael Ferguson (Australian politician) (born 1974), Australian politician
Michael Ferguson (director) (1937–2021), British television director who worked on the BBC science fiction television series Doctor Who
Michael Ferguson, Canadian policeman convicted for the manslaughter of Darren Varley 
Michael Ferguson (Auditor General) (1958–2019), Auditor General of Canada
Michael Ferguson (Connecticut politician), member of the Connecticut House of Representatives
Mick Ferguson (born 1954), former footballer from Newcastle, England
Mike Ferguson (footballer) (1943–2019), footballer from Lancashire, England
Mike Ferguson (New Jersey politician) (born 1970), United States politician from New Jersey
Mike Ferguson (Missouri politician), United States politician from Missouri
Michael Ferguson (biochemist) (born 1957), British biochemist, University of Dundee
Mike Ferguson (golfer) (born 1952), Australian golfer